The Crestview League is a high school athletic league that is part of the CIF Southern Section. Members are located in Orange County and are part of the Century Conference which is composed of team that were previously part of the Century League.

Members
 Canyon High School
 El Dorado High School (Baseball, LaCrosse, Soccer, Volleyball and Girls Tennis only)	
 El Modena High School (Baseball, Football and LaCrosse only)
 Esperanza High School
 Foothill High School
 Yorba Linda High School

References

CIF Southern Section leagues